Cuda or CUDA may refer to:

 CUDA, a parallel programming framework by Nvidia
 Barracuda Networks, an American computer security and data storage company
 Milan Čuda (born 1939), Czech volleyball player
 Plymouth Barracuda, an automobile
 Cuda, a Celtic/Brythonic goddess residing in what is now the Cotswolds

See also
 Barracuda (disambiguation)